Tominje is a village west of Ilirska Bistrica in the Inner Carniola region of Slovenia.

The local church in the settlement is dedicated to Saint Vitus and belongs to the Parish of Knežak.

References

External links
Tominje on Geopedia

Populated places in the Municipality of Ilirska Bistrica